Orsa Lia, born in Virginia, is a female singer. She recorded some jingles for television commercials in the 1970s before signing on with an upstart record label, Infinity Records, in the late 1970s.

She is best known for the song, "I Never Said I Love You", which was written and produced by Hal David and Archie Jordan. David had been a longtime collaborator with Burt Bacharach on many well-known songs, most notably for singer Dionne Warwick. Country singer Barbara Mandrell recorded "I Never Said I Love You" on her 1976 lp "Midnight Angel". Although "I Never Said I Love You" only reached number 84 on the Billboard Hot 100 pop singles chart in April 1979, the song did spend one week at number one on the Billboard Adult Contemporary chart that same month. It was Lia's only song to reach the music charts in the United States. It also peaked at number 63 in Australia.

Later in 1979, Lia recorded a duet with singer Dobie Gray, who was also signed to Infinity Records. However, by this time the label was in dire financial straits, and it wound up folding and becoming a part of its parent company, MCA Records.

See also
List of artists who reached number one on the U.S. Adult Contemporary chart

References

Hyatt, Wesley (1999). The Billboard Book of #1 Adult Contemporary Hits (Billboard Publications)

Year of birth missing (living people)
Living people
American women singers
People from Virginia
21st-century American women